Thomas Claughton (c. August 1773 – 8 March 1842) was a politician in England.

He was Member of Parliament (MP) for the rotten borough of Newton in Lancashire from 1818 until 1825. His sons Thomas Legh Claughton and Piers Claughton became bishops in the Anglican Church (Thomas of Rochester then St Albans; Piers of St Helena then Colombo) while his grandson Gilbert Claughton (son of Thomas) was created a baronet in 1912.

References

External links 
 

1773 births
1842 deaths
Members of the Parliament of the United Kingdom for English constituencies
UK MPs 1812–1818
UK MPs 1818–1820
UK MPs 1820–1826
UK MPs 1826–1830
UK MPs 1830–1831
UK MPs 1831–1832